Robert Wyss (17 January 1901 – 13 May 1956) was a Swiss freestyle swimmer and water polo player. He competed in the breaststroke event at the 1924 Summer Olympics and the 1928 Summer Olympics and played water polo at the 1924, 1928 and 1936 Summer Olympics.

References

External links
 

1901 births
1956 deaths
Swiss male freestyle swimmers
Swiss male water polo players
Olympic swimmers of Switzerland
Olympic water polo players of Switzerland
Swimmers at the 1924 Summer Olympics
Swimmers at the 1928 Summer Olympics
Water polo players at the 1924 Summer Olympics
Water polo players at the 1928 Summer Olympics
Water polo players at the 1936 Summer Olympics
Swiss male breaststroke swimmers
Sportspeople from Basel-Stadt
20th-century Swiss people